John K. S. McKay (18 November 1939 – 19 April 2022) was a British-Canadian mathematician and academic who worked at Concordia University, known for his discovery of monstrous moonshine, his joint construction of some sporadic simple groups, for the McKay conjecture in representation theory, and for the McKay correspondence relating certain finite groups to Lie groups.

Biography
McKay was educated at Dulwich College, earned his Bachelor and Diploma in 1961 and 1962 at the University of Manchester, and his PhD in 1971 from the University of Edinburgh.
Since 1974 he worked at Concordia University, since 1979 as a professor in Computer Science.

He was elected a fellow of the Royal Society of Canada in 2000, and won the 2003 CRM-Fields-PIMS prize.

In April 2007 a Joint Conference was organised by the Université de Montréal and Concordia University honouring four decades of the work of John McKay.

See also
ADE classification
Centre de Recherches Mathématiques

Publications

References

External links
John McKay web page at CRM
CRM-Fields prize

1939 births
2022 deaths
20th-century English mathematicians
21st-century English mathematicians
Group theorists
Academic staff of Concordia University
20th-century Canadian mathematicians
Alumni of the University of Manchester
Alumni of the University of Edinburgh
Fellows of the Royal Society of Canada
English emigrants to Canada
British mathematicians
21st-century Canadian mathematicians
People from Kent